521 Exhibition East was a streetcar route in Toronto, Ontario, Canada, operated by the Toronto Transit Commission from the 1960s to 1986 and briefly again in 1995 and 2013.

History
The 521 Exhibition East is the last surviving streetcar route to serve the Canadian National Exhibition. In April 1980, the name "Exhibition East" was finally made official, from the former streetcar route name, "King Exhibition." This streetcar route operated on special occasions and events that took place at Exhibition Place, such as the Canadian National Exhibition, and the Molson Indy.

521 operated from Richmond, Victoria, and Queen, then west to Church Street. It would then go west on King Street, then south on Bathurst Street, and then west on Fleet Street, where it would go directly to the Exhibition Loop.

On the other hand, another streetcar route named 522 Exhibition West operated alongside 521. This route operated from Dundas West Station, where it would run south on Roncesvalles, east on King Street, south on Dufferin, straight to the Dufferin Gates at Exhibition Place. This streetcar route also only operated on special occasions, like route 521. Labour Day of 1986, marked the final operation day of this route, which would later be replaced by the 93 Exhibition West bus, but reinstated for one year in 1995 during the CNE.

Resurrection
In August 2013, the 521 Exhibition East route was temporarily reinstated because of ongoing construction affecting the 509 Harbourfront line, which ran from Union Station to the Exhibition Loop. On the other hand, the 522 Exhibition West route was reinstated as route 193 Exhibition Rocket, which ran from Dundas West station to Exhibition Loop, though that service was discontinued in 2018. Later that year, the 929 Dufferin express started operating from Dufferin gate loop to Dufferin station before continuing north.

In 2016, the 514 Cherry started operations and ran from Dufferin gate to Distillery loop, effectively an extension of the 521 except it terminates at the loop to the west of the CNE rather than the east. Later in 2018, the 514 was merged into the 504 King, creating the 504B From Dufferin gate loop to Broadview station.

Route
The route of the 521 started at Exhibition Loop, and ran east on Fleet Street, north on Bathurst Street, then east on King Street West, passing by both St. Andrew Station and King Station, then terminating at Church Street. The route shared its tracks with the 504 King on King Street, the 509 Harbourfront on Fleet Street, and the 511 Bathurst on Fleet Street and Bathurst Street.

See also
Toronto streetcar system
504 King

References

Streetcar routes in Toronto
4 ft 10⅞ in gauge railways